Abbas Kandi may refer to:
 Abbas Kandi, Ardabil
 Abbas Kandi, Baba Jik, Chaldoran County, West Azerbaijan Province
 Abbas Kandi, Chaldoran-e Shomali, Chaldoran County, West Azerbaijan Province